The Japan Men's National Wheelchair Basketball Team is the wheelchair basketball side that represents Japan in international competitions for men as part of the International Wheelchair Basketball Federation.

Current roster
The following 12 players named for the Wheelchair basketball at the 2020 Summer Paralympics – Men's tournament.

Head coach:Kazuyuki Kyoya

Competitions

Wheelchair Basketball World Championship

Summer Paralympics

Other

See also
Japan women's national wheelchair basketball team

References

National men's wheelchair basketball teams
W
National mens